Below is a list of National Amateur Boxing Welterweight Champions, also known as United States Amateur Champions, along with the state or region which they represented.  The United States National Boxing Championships bestow the title of United States Amateur Champion on amateur boxers for winning the annual national amateur boxing tournament organized by USA Boxing, the national governing body for Olympic boxing and is the United States' member organization of the International Amateur Boxing Association (AIBA).  It is one of four premier amateur boxing tournaments, the others being the National Golden Gloves Tournament, which crowns its own amateur welterweight champion, the Police Athletic League Tournament, and the United States Armed Forces Tournament, all sending champions to the US Olympic Trials.  It was contested at 147lbs until 2002 when it was changed to 152lbs.

1897 - A. McIntosh, New York, New York
1898 - A. McIntosh, New York, New York
1899 - Percey McIntyre, New York, New York
1900 - J.J. Dukelow, New York, New York
1901 - J.J. Dukelow, New York, New York
1902 - Charles McCann, Philadelphia, Pennsylvania
1903 - John Leavy, New York, New York
1904 - C.T. Mitchell, Waltham, Massachusetts
1905 - H.L. McKinnon, Boston, Massachusetts
1906 - William McDonald, San Francisco, California
1907 - W.J. Kirkland, St. Phillip's
1908 - William Rolfe, Boston, Massachusetts
1909 - M.J. McNamara, Cambridge, Massachusetts
1910 - Hillard Long, Toronto, ON, Canada
1911 - John Fisher, New York, New York
1912 - Charles Askins, Boston, Massachusetts
1913 - Charles Askins, Boston, Massachusetts
1914 - W. Woldman, Cleveland, Ohio
1915 - Augie Ratner, New York, New York
1916 - Eugene Brosseau, Montreal, Quebec, Canada
1917 - Daniel O'Connor, Dorchester, New York
1918 - James Sullivan, New York, New York
1919 - Dave Rosenberg, New York, New York
1920 - J. Schroendorf, Milwaukee, Wisconsin
1921 - Charles Jennkissen, Los Angeles, California
1922 - Harry Simons, Gary, Indiana
1923 - John Rinl, Cleveland, Ohio
1924 - Al Mello, Lowella, Massachusetts
1925 - Bernard Barde, Dartmouth College
1926 - Edward Tiernan, New York, New York
1927 - Tommy Lown, New York, New York
1928 - Tommy Lown, New York, New York
1929 - Leslie Baker, Watertown, Massachusetts
1930 - Charles Kelly, Newton, Massachusetts
1931 - Edward Flynn, New Orleans, Louisiana
1932 - Edward Flynn, New Orleans, Louisiana
1933 - W. Celebron, Chicago, Illinois
1934 - Danny Farrar, Youngstown, Ohio
1935 - Jimmy Clark, Buffalo, New York
1936 - Leo Sweeney, Pittsburgh, Pennsylvania
1937 - Johnny Marquez, San Francisco, California
1938 - James O'Malley, Chicago, Illinois
1939 - Cozy Storace, Rome, New York
1940 - Henry Brimm, Buffalo, New York
1941 - Dave Andrews, Lowell, Massachusetts
1942 - Willard Buckless, Saugas, Massachusetts
1943 - C. Cooper, Washington, D.C.
1944 - Joe Gannon, Washington, D.C.
1945 - Abe Lee, Chicago, Illinois
1946 - Robert Takeshita, Hawaii
1947 - Jackie Keough, Cleveland, Ohio
1948 - Eugene Linscott, Grand Rapids, Michigan
1949 - Maurice Harper, Oakland, California
1950 - Gil Turner, Philadelphia, Pennsylvania
1951 - Rudy Gwin, Cleveland, Ohio
1952 - Andy Anderson, US Navy
1953 - Fred Terry, Germantown, Pennsylvania
1954 - Joe Bethea, Seattle, WA
1955 - Walter Sabbath, Detroit, Michigan
1956 - Jackson Brown, US Air Force
1957 - Don Jullinger, Lima, Ohio
1958 - Gary Gauvink, New York, New York (boxed professionally as Grey Gavin)
1959 - Vernon Vinson, Cleveland, Ohio
1960 - Phil Baldwin, Muskegon, Michigan
1961 - Phil Baldwin, Muskegon, Michigan
1962 - Wade Smith, Muncie, Indiana
1963 - Wade Smith, Muncie, Indiana
1964 - Jess Valdez, Houston, Texas
1965 - Hedgemon Lewis, Detroit, Michigan
1966 - Roland Pryor, Washington, D.C.
1967 - Kim Booker, San Francisco, California
1968 - Mike Colbert, Portland, OR
1969 - Armando Muniz, US Army
1970 - Armando Muniz, US Army
1971 - Sammy Maul, Dayton, Ohio
1972 - Fred Washington, US Army
1973 - William Tuttle, Bowie, MD
1974 - Clint Jackson, Nashville, Tennessee
1975 - Clint Jackson, Nashville, Tennessee
1976 - Clint Jackson, Nashville, Tennessee
1977 - Mike McCallum, Nashville, Tennessee
1978 - Roger Leonard, US Air Force
1979 - Donald Curry, Fort Worth, Texas
1980 - Gene Hatcher, Fort Worth, Texas
1981 - Darryl Robinson, Houston, Texas
1982 - Mark Breland, New York, New York (spring), Ron Essett (winter)
1983 - Mark Breland, New York, New York
1984 - Darryl Lattimore, Washington, D.C.
1985 - Kenneth Gould, Rockford, Illinois
1986 - Kenneth Gould, Rockford, Illinois
1987 - Kenneth Gould, Rockford, Illinois
1988 - Alton Rice, US Army
1989 - Raúl Márquez, Houston, Texas
1990 - Emmett Linton, Tacoma, WA
1991 - Pat Briceno, Vancouver, WA
1992 - Clayton Williams, Roseville, California
1993 - Hector Colon, Milwaukee, Wisconsin
1994 - David Reid, Philadelphia, Pennsylvania
1995 - Bobby Lewis, Cincinnati, Ohio
1996 - David Palac, Hamtramck, Michigan
1997 - LeChaunce Shepherd, Milwaukee, Wisconsin
1998 - Larry Mosley, Los Angeles, California
1999 - Larry Mosley, Los Angeles, California
2000 - LeChaunce Shepherd, Milwaukee, Wisconsin
2001 - Anthony Thompson, Philadelphia, Pennsylvania
2002 - Rondale Mason, Fort Carson, Colorado
2003 - Juan McPherson, Cleveland, Ohio
2004 - Austin Trout, Las Cruces, New Mexico
2005 - Demetrius Andrade, Providence, Rhode Island
2006 - Demetrius Andrade, Providence, Rhode Island
2007 - Charles Hatley, Dallas, Texas
2008 - Javontae Starks, Minneapolis, MN
2009 - Errol Spence Jr., Desoto, TX
2010 - Errol Spence Jr., Desoto, TX
2011 - Errol Spence Jr., Desoto, TX
2012 - Patrick Day, Freeport, NY
2013 - Jamontay Clark, Cincinnati, OH
2014 - Jose Alday, Odessa, TX
2015 - Ardreal Holmes, Flint, MI
2019 - Jameel Fields-Carr, Omaha, Ne

References

 

Welter
Welterweight boxers